Peter Poetscher is an Austrian para-alpine skier. He represented Austria at the 1994 Winter Paralympics and he competed in four events in alpine skiing:

 Men's Downhill LW1/3
 Men's Slalom LW1/3
 Men's Super-G LW1/3
 Men's Giant Slalom LW1/3

He won the bronze medal at the Men's Downhill LW1/3 event.

See also 
 List of Paralympic medalists in alpine skiing

References 

Living people
Year of birth missing (living people)
Place of birth missing (living people)
Paralympic alpine skiers of Austria
Alpine skiers at the 1994 Winter Paralympics
Medalists at the 1994 Winter Paralympics
Paralympic bronze medalists for Austria
Paralympic medalists in alpine skiing
20th-century Austrian people